Herbert Weiz (born 27 June 1924) is a German politician who held several posts in East Germany. Being a member of the ruling party Socialist Unity Party (SED), he served as minister of science and technology and deputy chairman of the Council of Ministers.

Early life and education
Weiz was born in Cumbach, Ernstroda, district of Gotha, on 27 June 1924. In 1942 he became a member of the Nazi Party and next year he joined the German army. He was captured by the Allies in 1943 and detained until 1945. Following his release he joined the political alliance between the Communist Party of Germany and the Social Democratic Party of Germany which would form the SED. Between 1946 and 1949 he attended the University of Jena. In 1962 received his PhD from the same university.

Career
In the period between 1955 and 1962 Weiz was the first deputy manager at VEB Carl Zeiss in Jena. In July 1958 he became a member of the central committee of the SED. In July 1962 he was appointed minister of research and technology which he held until December 1966. In May 1963 he was made a member of the Research Council and served in the post until October 1966. From 1963 to March 1990 he served as a deputy at the People's Chamber. In 1967 he was named as the deputy chairman of the Council of Ministers or deputy prime minister. In 1974 Weiz was appointed minister of science and technology. In November–December 1989 he resigned from all of his posts, including his membership from the central committee of the SED.

References

External links

1924 births
Deputy prime ministers
Living people
German Army personnel of World War II
German prisoners of war in World War II
Government ministers of East Germany
Members of the Central Committee of the Socialist Unity Party of Germany
Members of the Volkskammer
People from Gotha (district)
People of the Cold War
University of Jena alumni